Ramban district is a district in the Indian union territory of Jammu and Kashmir, located in the lap of the Pir Panjal range. It was carved out as a separate district from erstwhile Doda district in 2007. It is located in the Jammu division. The district headquarters are at Ramban town, which is located midway between Jammu and Srinagar along the Chenab river in the Chenab valley on National Highway-44, approximately 151 km from Jammu and Srinagar.

Administration

Ramban District is divided into eight tehsils: Banihal, Ramban, Khari, Rajgarh, Batote, Gool, Pogal Paristan (Ukhral) and Ramsoo.

Each tehsil has its tehsildar, who is the administrative head. The district consisted of 116 census villages and 127 revenue villages in 2001. The total number of panchayat Halqas in the district was 124.

District Development Council Ramban 
In the elections for Ramban's District Development Council, Shamshad Begum was elected chairman and Rabiya Beigh was elected vice-chairman.

Geography
Ramban district is 1,156 metres (3,792 feet) above sea level (on average). The boundary lines of Ramban district encompass hill station Patnitop as its southernmost point, Assar on its eastern edge, Gool to the west, and Banihal to the north. The terrain of district Ramban is tough and hilly. District Ramban shares its boundary with Reasi, Udhampur, Doda, Anantnag and Kulgam districts.

Climate
The climate of the district varies according to altitude. The temperature rises as high as 42 °C in the low-lying areas like Ramban town located in between steep mountains on the banks of Chenab River and drops to sub-zero in high-altitude areas like Sangaldan, Gool, Dhagantop, Asthanmarg, Lalagundi, Budhan, Pogal, Paristan, Neel. The working season in most of the district is about eight months because of weather conditions in the district.

Politics

Ramban district has three assembly constituencies: Ramban, Banihal and Gool batote
.

On 21 January 2021, Ramban district was declared a 'terrorist free' district in Jammu and Kashmir.

Demographics

According to the 2011 census, Ramban district has a population of 283,713. roughly equal to the nation of Barbados. This gives it a ranking of 573rd in India (out of a total of 640). Its population growth rate over the decade 2001-2011 was 31.81%. Ramban has a sex ratio of 902 females for every 1000 males, and a literacy rate of 54.27%.

Tourist attractions

Sanasar 

Tourist activities Sanasar include paragliding, hot air ballooning, trekking, camping, golf, rock climbing and abseiling.

Major projects 

 Baglihar Dam
 Pir Panjal Railway Tunnel
 Banihal Qazigund Road Tunnel
 Dr. Syama Prasad Mookerjee Tunnel
Sangaldan Railway Station
Sangaldan Tunnel

See also
Ramban
Banihal
Banihal Pass
Doda District
Jammu and Kashmir
Chenab Valley
Sangaldan
Pir Panjal Range
Baglihar Dam
Badshah Khan (wrestler)
Chanderkot

References

External links 
 Official website

 
Districts of Jammu and Kashmir